The 1975–76 Libyan Premier League was the 12th edition of the competition since its inception in 1963. It brought together the best teams at regional level:

Al Madina (Western Champions)
Ahly Benghazi (Eastern Champions)
Qurthabia (Southern Champions)

Classification

Libyan Premier League seasons
Libya
Premier League